Florya Metin Oktay Facilities, is the training ground and academy base of the Turkish football club Galatasaray SK. 
The Florya training camp land was brought during the presidency of Suphi Batur, built and opened during Professor Ali Uras presidency and was expanded and improved during both Ali Tanriyar and Alp Yalman presidencies.
It was opened on August 1, 1981. It is used for first team and youth team training and matches, as well as by many of the other sports teams at the club, including those for basketball and volleyball. Facility is fully operational.

List of Facilities 
 Central administration building
Camp building
4 full course grass pitches
Junior team facility
Indoor sports facility
Galatasaray football school
Galatasaray hospital
Basketball facility
Volleyball facility
Restaurants
Recreation Area

References

External links
Official webpage

Galatasaray S.K. facilities
Galatasaray S.K. (men's football)
Galatasaray S.K. (women's football)
Metin Oktay
Sport in Bakırköy